Batman Dracula is a 1964 black and white American superhero fan film produced and directed by Andy Warhol without the permission of DC Comics, who owns the character Batman.

Production background
The film was screened only at Warhol's art exhibits. A fan of the Batman comic series, Warhol made the film as an homage. Jack Smith appeared as both Batman and his nemesis, Count Dracula.

The film was thought to be lost until scenes from it were shown at some length in the documentary Jack Smith and the Destruction of Atlantis (2006).

Cast
 Tally Brown as Florence, Granddaughter of Old Woman and Old Man
 Beverly Grant as Rose 
 Sam Green
 Dorothy Dean as Doris
 Bob Heide
 Baby Jane Holzer as Rebecca, Sister of Sydney and Titus
 Sally Kirkland
 Ron Link
 Naomi Levine as Elizabeth, Daughter of Gaston
 Gerard Malanga
 Mario Montez
 Billy Name
 Taylor Mead
 Ivy Nicholson as Roxanne 
 Jack Smith as Batman/Dracula
 Andy Warhol
 Gregory Battcock
 David Bourdon

Production
The project was filmed on the beaches of Long Island and on the roofs of New York City.

See also
 List of American films of 1964
 Andy Warhol filmography
 Batman Fights Dracula, a 1967 Filipino film
 Batman & Dracula trilogy

References

External links
 
 

1964 films
1964 independent films
1960s superhero films
American vampire films
Unofficial Batman films
Films directed by Andy Warhol
Dracula films
American black-and-white films
Films shot in New York (state)
1960s rediscovered films
Rediscovered American films
1960s English-language films
1960s American films